Gabriel Kuhn (born 1972) is a political writer and translator based in Sweden.

Biography
Kuhn became straight edge and active in radical circles as a teenager.

Following post-secondary studies in Austria and the United States, Kuhn lived in the Middle East and the South Pacific Islands.

Since 2005, Kuhn has lived in Sweden. Kuhn holds a PhD in philosophy with a speciality in poststructuralism. His thinking has been influenced by classical anarchism and Anglo-American Cultural Studies. The key focus of Kuhn's political activity has been on bridging the gap between theory and practice. Kuhn's conception of community is one based on solidarity with oppressed peoples. Alongside his political and social involvement, Kuhn has in the past played soccer semi-professionally.

In 2010, Kuhn was forced to cancel a three-month speaking tour of the United States after being denied authorization to travel by US authorities.  Kuhn believes he had been placed on the "No Fly List."

Work
Kuhn has been politically active since 1989, and his written work, developed in that context, is directed towards left-wing activists and scholars. In the 1990s, he worked with the Austrian autonomist journal TATblatt and the Vienna anarchist publisher Monte Verita. Kuhn founded Alpine Anarchist Productions (AAP) in 2000.

His annotated anthology of contemporary American anarchism, translated into German, Neuer Anarchismus in den USA. Seattle und die Folgen (2008), was named "Book of the Year" by Berlin's
Bibliothek der Freien.

Selected bibliography
 Women Pirates and the Politics of the Jolly Roger With Ulrike Klausmann und Marion Meinzerin. BlackRose, Montreal 1997  TB 
 Prison Round Trip by Klaus Viehmann. Translator. PM Press & Kersplebedeb, Oakland & Montreal 2009 
 Life Under the Jolly Roger: Reflections on Golden Age Piracy PM Press, Oakland 2010 
 Sober Living for the Revolution: Hardcore Punk, Straight Edge, and Radical Politics Editor. PM Press, Oakland 2010 
 Revolution and Other Writings: A Political Reader by Gustav Landauer. Editor and translator. PM Press, Oakland 2010 
 Liberating Society from the State and Other Writings: A Political Reader by Erich Mühsam. Editor and translator. PM Press, Oakland 2011 
 Soccer vs. the State: Tackling Football and Radical Politics PM Press, Oakland 2011 
 All Power to the Councils! A Documentary History of the German Revolution of 1918–1919. Editor and translator. PM Press, Oakland 2012 
 Turning Money into Rebellion: The Unlikely Story of Denmark's Revolutionary Bank Robbers Editor. PM Press & Kersplebedeb, Oakland & Montreal 2014 
 Playing as if the World Mattered: An Illustrated History of Activism in Sports PM Press, Oakland 2015 
 Antifascism, Sports, Sobriety: Forging a Militant Working-Class Culture. Selected Writings by Julius Deutsch. Editor and Translator. PM Press, Oakland 2017 
 X: Straight Edge and Radical Sobriety. Editor. PM Press, Oakland 2019 
 Liberating Sápmi: Indigenous Resistance in Europe's Far North. PM Press, Oakland 2020

References

External links
 LeftTwoThree Personal blog/archive
 PM Press author page
 Alpine Anarchist Productions
 Unrast author page
 Interview with Gabriel Kuhn about Sober Living for the Revolution (video)
 DIY Conspiracy interview with Gabriel Kuhn about Straight Edge subculture

Anarchist theorists
Austrian anarchists
1972 births
Living people
Writers from Innsbruck
Austrian male writers
English–German translators